John Rowland may refer to:

 Bo Rowland (1903–1964), American football player and coach, basketball player
 John A. Rowland (1791–1873), California pioneer
 John G. Rowland (born 1957), American (former) Governor of Connecticut
 John Sharpe Rowland (1798–1863), 19th-century American politician
 John Rowland (diplomat) (1925–1996), Australian diplomat
 John Rowland (footballer, born 1936) (1936–2002), Welsh footballer
 John Rowland (footballer, born 1941) (1941–2020), English footballer
 John Cambrian Rowland (1819–1890), Welsh painter
 John T. Rowland (1871–1945), American architect
 John Rowland (MP), represented Winchelsea

Characters
 John Rowland (Desperate Housewives), character in the U.S. television series Desperate Housewives
 John Rowland: the main protagonist in the 1898 novella The Wreck of the Titan: Or, Futility by Morgan Robertson

See also
 John Roland (born 1941), American former news presenter and reporter
 John Rowlands (disambiguation)